Oosterhoff is a surname. Notable people with the surname include:

Pieter Oosterhoff, Dutch astronomer
Sam Oosterhoff, Canadian politician
Tonnus Oosterhoff, Dutch poet

See also
1738 Oosterhoff, minor planet